LNSO may refer to:
Latvian National Symphony Orchestra
Lithuanian National Symphony Orchestra